United Nations Security Council resolution 542, adopted unanimously on 23 November 1983, after considering the situation in northern Lebanon, the Council expressed its concern at the fighting in the north of the country, deploring all loss of life.

The Council demanded a ceasefire from all parties concerned, and paid tribute to various humanitarian organisations for their efforts. It also requested the Secretary-General to continue to monitor the situation.

See also 
 Lebanese Civil War
 List of United Nations Security Council Resolutions 501 to 600 (1982–1987)

References
Text of the Resolution at undocs.org

External links
 

 0542
1983 in Lebanon
 0542
November 1983 events